Pearl Gladys Jansen (born 1950 in Bonteheuwel) is a South African beauty queen and singer who ends up first runner-up in the Miss World beauty contest in the UK in 1970. She became the first coloured woman to represent her country at this level even if she competed as "Miss Africa South" due to apartheid.

Biography 
Jansen was 20 when she entered the 1970 beauty contest. She also has been portrayed in the film Misbehaviour. She has stated that after the contest nothing changed for her because of apartheid. She waited until she was 58 years old to fulfill her dream of becoming a singer.

1970 Miss World contest 
The 1970 contest was held in London, United Kingdom. It began with a row because the organisers had allowed two entries from South Africa, one black, Pearl Jansen, and one white. Then during the evening there were protests by women's liberation activists and flour was thrown.  The comedian, Bob Hope, was also heckled. Jennifer Hosten, Miss Grenada, won, becoming the first black woman to win Miss World, and Pearl Jansen was placed second.

Bibliography 
 Jennifer Hosten, Miss World 1970: The Craziest Pageant in History and the Rest of My Life, Sutherland House Incorporated, 2020

References

External links
 

Living people
Miss World 1970 delegates
1950 births
People from Cape Town
South African singers
Cape Coloureds